State Fire Service (PSP) is a professional fire fighting service in Poland. It is subordinate to the Polish Ministry of Interior and Administration. The modern State Fire Service is based on the 1992 legislation.

State Fire Service covers the entire territory of Poland. In all the second-level units of local government and administration in Poland - powiat (county, district) -, fire brigades operate district headquarters (Komenda Powiatowa Państwowej Straży Pożarnej), city headquarters in bigger cities (Komenda Miejska Państwowej Straży Pożarnej) with command posts and dispatch centers alongside one or several fire stations (Jednostka Ratowniczo-Gaśnicza JRG). They are subject to 16 provincial headquarters (Komenda Wojewódzka Państwowej Straży Pożarnej).

Professional firefighters (PSP) respond immediately after the alarm and are often assisted by volunteers associated in Voluntary Fire Service (Ochotnicza Straż Pożarna, OSP) with more than 15,700 fire stations in nearly every bigger settlement.

Structure
National Headquarters of the State Fire Service (Warsaw)
 Voivodeship Headquarters in Białystok
 Voivodeship Headquarters in Gdańsk
 Voivodeship Headquarters in Gorzów Wielkopolski
 Voivodeship Headquarters in Katowice
 Voivodeship Headquarters in Kielce
 Voivodeship Headquarters in Kraków
 Voivodeship Headquarters in Lublin
 Voivodeship Headquarters in Łódź
 Voivodeship Headquarters in Olsztyn
 Voivodeship Headquarters in Opole
 Voivodeship Headquarters in Poznań
 Voivodeship Headquarters in Rzeszów
 Voivodeship Headquarters in Szczecin
 Voivodeship Headquarters in Toruń
 Voivodeship Headquarters in Warszawa
 Voivodeship Headquarters in Wrocław
Each Voivodeship Headquarters supervises District Headquarters (335 in 2019) and fire-fighting units.

The State Fire Service operates 5 fire academies:
 Main School of Fire Service 
 Central School of State Fire Service in Częstochowa 
 School of Aspirants of the State Fire Service in Kraków
 School of Aspirants of the State Fire Service in Poznań 
 Non-commissioned Officers School of the State Fire Service in Bydgoszcz

Voluntary Fire Service

In Poland local inhabitants may create a Voluntary Fire Brigade (Ochotnicza Straż Pożarna, OSP) under proper law. Such departments may receive financial assistance from the government for purchasing equipment or training the staff. In certain areas of Poland almost every town and village has a volunteer fire department. Volunteer fire departments are usually fully integrated into the National Fire and Rescue System (Krajowy System Ratowniczo-Gaśniczy, KSRG). Any call to the fire emergency number is routed to the nearest State Fire Service (PSP) station in powiat (Komenda Powiatowa PSP) that coordinates the forces in the area. After the alarm, the volunteers arrive to the fire station and then respond to the emergency.

Ranks and rank insignia

Source:

Firefighters from State Fire Service (PSP, JRG) use red helmets. Firefighters from Voluntary Fire Service (OSP) use white helmets.

See also 
 Ochotnicza straż pożarna w Polsce Volunteer Fire Brigade (Polish)
 Warsaw Fire Guard (Defunct)
 Zakładowa straż pożarna Factory Fire Guards (Polish)

References

External links 

 Official homepage, English language version

1992 establishments in Poland
Organizations established in 1992
Fire departments
Government agencies of Poland